Robert Lewis Beardslee, Sr. (1868 – 1926) was a Republican city attorney of Stockton, California and state legislator who served as the 36th Speaker of the California State Assembly in the early 1900s.

Biography
Robert Beardslee was born in 1868 in San Joaquin County, a rural California county east of the San Francisco Bay Area. He attended public schools and graduated from San Joaquin Valley College. He was admitted to practice law and then served as the City Attorney of Stockton, California in 1905 and 1906.

On November 8, 1904, he was elected to represent the 23rd Assembly District, which encompassed the City of Stockton (now renumbered the 17th Assembly District). Beardslee served in the Assembly until 1911, including service as Speaker of the Assembly during the 1907 session.

His son, Robert L. Beardslee, Jr. (August 3, 1905March 3, 1999), was also a lawyer, and was a partner in Neumiller & Beardslee with Charlie Neumiller.

Notes

References

External links
 

1868 births
1926 deaths
Politicians from Stockton, California
Speakers of the California State Assembly
Republican Party members of the California State Assembly
California lawyers
19th-century American lawyers